The Lost Evidence is a television program on The History Channel which uses three-dimensional landscapes, reconnaissance photos, eyewitness testimony and documents to reevaluate and recreate key battles of World War II. The entire series was made up of 23 fifty-minute episodes with the exception of the D-Day episode, which is 100 minutes in length (or 1 hour and 40 minutes).

The first episode was aired in the UK in 2004.

Broadcast Airings
Repeats of the series are currently airing on Military History and the digital broadcast network Quest.

See also
The History Channel
Shootout!
Dogfights

External links 
The Lost Evidence website

History (American TV channel) original programming
2000s British documentary television series
2004 British television series debuts
2004 British television series endings
World War II television series